Diplodactylus bilybara, sometimes called the western fat-tailed gecko, is a gecko endemic to Australia. This gecko can be found in Western Australia along the central west coast.  The species average length is 6.3 cm or 2.48 inches. These are generally reddish brown or grey. Their reproduction is oviparous.

References

Diplodactylus
Reptiles described in 2014
Geckos of Australia
Taxa named by Patrick J. Couper
Taxa named by Paul M. Oliver
Taxa named by Mitzy Pepper